North Carolina Highway 294 (NC 294) is a primary state highway in the U.S. state of North Carolina. The highway serves to connect communities along the southern banks of the Hiwassee River.

Route description

NC 294 is a two-lane mountain rural highway that is wholly in the Nantahala National Forest. From its western terminus at the Tennessee state line, it connects the communities of Liberty, Suit and Letitia to its eastern terminus at U.S. Route 64 (US 64) and US 74. It also goes by Fields of the Wood, a bible park, and access to the Hiwassee Dam.

History
Established in 1931 as a new primary routing, NC 294 traveled from NC 28 (today US 64/US 74), through Postell, to the Tennessee state line. In 1932, it was extended east by overlapping with US 64/NC 28 then southwest on new primary routing to the Georgia state line, towards Blue Ridge. In 1934, NC 294 eastern terminus was truncated back to its original and current location; its newer segment renumbered to NC 60. In 1942, NC 294 was rerouted north onto upgraded existing and new construction, bypassing Postell on Candy Mountain Road (SR 1150).

Junction list

References

External links

NCRoads.com: N.C. 294

294
Transportation in Cherokee County, North Carolina